Events of 2020 in Ghana.

Incumbents 
President: Nana Akufo-Addo 
Vice President: Mahamudu Bawumia

Events
March 4 – Creation of OmniBSIC Bank Ghana Limited.
December 7 – 2020 Ghanaian general election: won by Nana Akufo-Addo with 51.59% of the vote.
December 29 – The National Democratic Congress (NDC) says it will contest the December 7 election result.

Deaths
April 10 – Jacob Plange-Rhule, 62, Rector of the Ghana College of Physicians and Surgeons (since 2015); COVID-19	
October 1 – Ray Styles, 31, pencil artist; liver cancer.
October 1 – Yakubu Moro, football executive, founder of Berekum Arsenal; stroke.
October 24 – Stephen Owusu, 37, footballer (Heart of Lions, Aduana Stars, national team).
November 12 – Jerry Rawlings, 73, politician, President of Ghana (1979, 1981–2001); COVID-19.
November 23 – Imoro Andani, royal, Northern Regional minister.

See also
2020 in West Africa
COVID-19 pandemic in Ghana
COVID-19 pandemic in Africa

References

 
2020s in Ghana
Years of the 21st century in Ghana
Ghana